Clay Martin is a National Football League (NFL) official. He wears uniform number 19. He entered the league in the  season as an umpire, and was promoted to referee for the  season, following the retirements of Terry McAulay and Gene Steratore.

Martin was born in Pensacola, Florida where his father, an officer in the United States Marine Corps, was stationed as a flight instructor after his return from Vietnam. Martin’s family moved to Tulsa, Oklahoma where Martin attended Tulsa Public Schools. Martin graduated from Nathan Hale High School where he was an All-State Football and Basketball player.

Outside of his NFL duties, Martin works as a high school basketball coach at Jenks High School in  Jenks, Oklahoma.  He also attended Oklahoma Baptist University where he played basketball for the Bison. Not only is he in the OBU Hall of Fame for his basketball accomplishments, he is also in the Tulsa Public Schools Hall of Fame for the same reasons. He is married to Shannon Martin and they have two kids: McKenzie, born in  2001, and Chase, born in 2003. Martin is a Christian.

Martin was diagnosed with COVID-19 on December 21, 2020, and became hospitalized on December 31, 2020. He was discharged within a week, and returned to officiate a divisional playoff game on January 17, 2021.

2022 Crew 
 R:Clay Martin
 U: Fred Bryan
 DJ: Jerrod Phillips
 LJ: Maia Chaka
 FJ: James Coleman
 SJ: Dave Hawkshaw
 BJ: Greg Wilson
 RO: Brian Matoren
 RA: Rick Loumiet

References

Living people
National Football League officials
1975 births
Tulsa Public Schools alumni